Tony Bourke (born 13 June 1976) is a former Australian rules footballer who played with Carlton in the Australian Football League (AFL).

Originally from East Ballarat Football Club in the Ballarat Football League (BFL), Bourke was drafted by Carlton at pick 67 at the 1994 AFL Draft but ongoing injury problems kept him out of the senior side until his debut in 1998.

Bourke played four games for Carlton across two seasons and was delisted at the end of the 1999 AFL season. He then transferred to Australian Capital Territory Football League (ACTFL) club Eastlake, before moving to Perth to play firstly for East Fremantle and then for South Fremantle in the Western Australian Football League (WAFL).

In 2012 Bourke was appointed coach of Eastlake in the North East Australian Football League (NEAFL).

Notes

External links

Tony Bourke's profile at Blueseum

1976 births
Carlton Football Club players
Greater Western Victoria Rebels players
East Ballarat Football Club players
South Fremantle Football Club players
East Fremantle Football Club players
Eastlake Football Club players
Australian rules footballers from Victoria (Australia)
Living people